Ceratopogon is a genus of flies belonging to the family Ceratopogonidae.

The genus was first described by Meigen in 1803.

The genus has almost cosmopolitan distribution.

Species:
 Ceratopogon communis
 Ceratopogon crassinervis
 Ceratopogon grandiforceps
 Ceratopogon lacteipennis
 Ceratopogon niveipennis
 Ceratopogon paucisetosus

References

Ceratopogonidae